Oral N. Bullen, Jr. (born February 18, 1983) is a former American soccer player.

Career
Bullen spent his college career at UMASS where he made a total of 75 appearances and tallied 21 goals and 12 assists. He also spent time with Albany Admirals in the USL Premier Development League.

In 2006, Bullen joined USL-1 club Portland Timbers where he played alongside his cousin Salim. He made 19 appearances for the Timbers and scored two goals with one assist.

During the 2006 season, Bullen also played indoor soccer for the Milwaukee Wave. In two seasons at the club he appeared in 47 matches and scored 3 goals and provided 6 assists. In 2008, he joined the New Jersey Ironmen and appeared in 20 matches for the team scoring 3 goals and recording 1 assist.

After a couple of years away from the outdoor game, Bullen spent the 2009 season with Newark Ironbound Express where he made 16 appearances and scored two goals.

References

External links
 UMASS bio
 justsportsstats.com

1983 births
Living people
American soccer players
UMass Minutemen soccer players
Albany BWP Highlanders players
Portland Timbers (2001–2010) players
Jersey Express S.C. players
Association football forwards
USL League Two players
USL First Division players
Sportspeople from Brooklyn
Soccer players from New York City
Milwaukee Wave players
New Jersey Ironmen players
Major Indoor Soccer League (2001–2008) players
Xtreme Soccer League players